Walnut Farm, also known as the Walnut Hill Farm and The Roosa Farm, is a historic home and farm located at Milford, Kent County, Delaware.  The house was built about 1867, and is a two-story, three bay "T"-planned frame dwelling in the Italianate style.  The main block has a hipped roof topped by a distinctive cupola.  Also on the property are a contributing frame barn, stock-pound and hog house, a shop, and corn crib.

It was listed on the National Register of Historic Places in 1982.

References

Farms on the National Register of Historic Places in Delaware
Italianate architecture in Delaware
Houses completed in 1867
Houses in Kent County, Delaware
Milford, Delaware
National Register of Historic Places in Kent County, Delaware